A Reflection of Fear is a 1972 American thriller film directed by William A. Fraker with a screenplay by Edward Hume and Lewis John Carlino and starring Sondra Locke, Robert Shaw, Mary Ure, Signe Hasso, Gordon Devol and Sally Kellerman. It is based on the novel Go to Thy Deathbed by Stanton Forbes.

The film spent a long time on the shelf. Principal photography was completed in the early part of 1971, but its premiere was not until late 1972 and its general release was not until the winter of 1973. Lead actress Locke was nearly twice the age of her character. Although Ure played Locke's mother, she was in fact only eleven years older than Locke.

Plot
The film is set in an alienated mansion in Eastern Canada that houses Marguerite, 15, the main protagonist, her mother Katherine and her maternal grandmother, Julia.

Marguerite suffers from what appears to be paranoia as is apparent when she is shown talking to her dolls, especially one named Aaron or an amoeba collected from a pond, or painting unsettling pictures in seclusion.  She also takes daily shots of what she believes is insulin, although the labels have been removed.

Out of the blue, she expresses her yearning to connect with her father, Michael, a writer, who was estranged from the family for a decade and is now in a relationship with a woman named Anne.  Katherine and Julia take issue with Marguerite's desire, but Michael, on the pretext of obtaining a divorce from Katherine, arrives at the hamlet with Anne and feels the need to fortify his relationship with his daughter.

In time, Marguerite's affection for her father turns inordinate and her sense of insecurity escalates as she is seen spying on the members of the household through crevices. "Aaron" murders Katherine in her bed with the aid of a wooden pole and also kills Julia.

Following these incidents, Marguerite is comforted by her father who arranges for an outing to a local beach for Marguerite, Anne and himself.  It is evident to Anne that the father-daughter relationship between Michael and Marguerite is excessive as is revealed by their immoderate physical contact and Michael's doting on her, even disregarding Anne who walks away dejectedly to be met with a knowing look from Hector, the young man at the inn.

After the picnic, Anne confronts Michael about his questionable behavior towards his daughter, following which they attempt to make love.  Marguerite is shown masturbating in her room, crying out for her father when she approaches her climax.  Hector attempts to make a move on Marguerite and mysteriously, his boat spirals out of control, killing him.  Later, Marguerite, who is intoxicated with the violent element in her personality, attempts to pounce on Anne, who has temporarily left Michael after an argument ensued, but is rendered safe by an unknown figure.

That night, Michael and Anne hear sounds of breaking glass upstairs; when Michael goes up to investigate, Marguerite, in the personality of Aaron with a stocking mask, repeatedly tries to kill him.  At last she stops attacking him and retreats, collapsing in a corner, unmasking and sobbing. As he comes toward her with a troubled expression, we hear a recording  of the call he made to the hospital in which Marguerite was delivered fifteen years ago, when the nurse informed him that Katherine had delivered not a girl but a boy.

Cast
 Sondra Locke as Marguerite
 Robert Shaw as Michael
 Sally Kellerman as Anne
 Mary Ure as Katherine
 Signe Hasso as Julia
 Gordon Devol as Hector
 Gordon Anderson as Aaron (voice only)
 Mitchell Ryan as Inspector McKenna
 Victoria Risk as Peggy
 Leonard Crofoot as Aaron
 Michael St. Clair as Kevin
 Liam Dunn as the Coroner 
 Michelle Marvin as the Nurse
 Michele Montau as Madame Caraquet

Reception
Roger Greenspun of The New York Times stated that "Sondra Locke has a virtuoso role, and I guess she is impressive, and Sally Kellerman is downright good. But "A Reflection of Fear" has been so ponderously paced and fatally overdecorated that performances can't count for much." In his review on DVD Talk, Paul Mavis writes, "there's no getting around the fact that much of A Reflection of Fear flat-out doesn't make sense. And that's okay up to a certain point, because the main story arc still comes through fairly clearly, and the scares and atmosphere help make up for the film's other shortcomings." TV Guide lauded Locke's delivery of her character, saying, "Locke is very effective in her psychotic role, giving the story an eerie quality that is otherwise lacking."

See also
 Dissociative identity disorder
 Electra complex
 Killer toys
 Incest in popular culture
 Oedipus complex

References

External links
 
 

1972 horror films
1970s mystery films
1970s thriller films
1972 films
American horror thriller films
American mystery films
Columbia Pictures films
Fiction about familicide
Films based on American novels
Films with screenplays by Lewis John Carlino
Matricide in fiction
Transgender-related films
1970s English-language films
Films directed by William A. Fraker
1970s American films